Ray Sherman (November 27, 1951) is an American football coach for the Vegas Vipers. Sherman has more than four decades of coaching at the college and professional levels.

Coaching career

College career
Sherman played college football at Fresno State as a wide receiver and defensive back. In 1974, he took a job as graduate assistant for San Jose State. After leaving San Jose State following that season, Sherman remained a coach at the college level through 1987, working for five additional schools; this includes two stints at California.

NFL career
The Houston Oilers gave Sherman his first NFL coaching job in 1988, when he was hired as a running backs coach. After one more year in Houston, during which he was a wide receivers coach, he took an assistant head coaching position with the Atlanta Falcons in 1990. Sherman then went to the San Francisco 49ers the next season, staying there through 1993; he coached running backs in 1991 and wide receivers the following two seasons. The Minnesota Vikings hired Sherman as quarterbacks coach in 1995, and he spent three seasons with the team. In 1998 and 1999, Sherman served as offensive coordinator of the Pittsburgh Steelers and Vikings, respectively. He was the wide receivers coach of the Green Bay Packers from 2000 to 2004, and held the same position with the Tennessee Titans in 2005 and 2006. The Dallas Cowboys hired him as wide receivers coach in 2007.

In January 2010, Sherman was considered for a head coaching position with the Oakland Raiders.

In January 2011, Sherman interviewed for the head coaching position of the Dallas Cowboys to satisfy the Rooney Rule, and it was thought that he might be offered the offensive coordinator job with the team. It was announced that Sherman will not return to the Cowboys for the 2011 season. In 2019, Sherman served as the Steelers interim wide receivers coach for the season following the death of the incumbent coach Darryl Drake that August.

Sherman was officially hired by the Vegas Vipers on September 13, 2022

Personal life
Sherman is married and is the father of three children, one of whom died in 2003.

References

1951 births
Living people
African-American coaches of American football
American football defensive backs
American football wide receivers
California Golden Bears football coaches
Dallas Cowboys coaches
Georgia Bulldogs football coaches
Green Bay Packers coaches
National Football League offensive coordinators
New York Jets coaches
Pittsburgh Steelers coaches
St. Louis Rams coaches
San Francisco 49ers coaches
Sportspeople from Berkeley, California
Wake Forest Demon Deacons football coaches
21st-century African-American people
20th-century African-American sportspeople